Matsumaeyama Takeshi (born 29 June 1940 as Sadao Watanabe) is a former sumo wrestler from Matsumae, Hokkaidō, Japan. He made his professional debut in January 1958 and reached the top division in July 1964. His shikona came from his birthplace of Matsumae. His highest rank was maegashira 9. He was forced to miss six tournaments after being diagnosed with pulmonary tuberculosis and fell to the sandanme division. However he managed to return to the sekitori level and won the jūryō division championship in March 1967 with a 12–3 record. This was his first tournament fighting for the newly formed Kokonoe stable. Upon retirement from active competition at the age of 27 he became an elder in the Japan Sumo Association under the name Onoe. He left the Sumo Association in November 1968 and opened a chankonabe restaurant in Kabukichō, Tokyo.

Career record

See also
Glossary of sumo terms
List of past sumo wrestlers
List of sumo tournament second division champions

References

1940 births
Living people
Japanese sumo wrestlers
Sumo people from Hokkaido
Kokonoe stable sumo wrestlers